Charlotte Alexandra Moore (born 19 June 1968) is a British television executive who is the BBC's Chief Content Officer. She was appointed to this role in September 2020, having been Director of Content since early 2016 when she assumed responsibility for all of the BBC's television channels after the controller posts were abolished. Moore was Controller of BBC One from 2013 to 2016, in the position of which she was reported to be in charge of a budget of more than £1 billion. 

Moore has, since 2005, been a trustee of the Grierson Trust, of which she is a Vice-Chair. She was made a Fellow of the Royal Television Society in 2016.

Early life 
Moore was born in June 1968 and grew up in Surrey. She attended Wycombe Abbey, an independent girls' boarding school in Buckinghamshire, and graduated with a Bachelor of Arts in History from Bristol University in 1990.

Career

Earlier career
Moore joined Ideal World as a producer-director of documentaries in 2002. As a freelancer in this joint role, her credits included "Lagos Airport", RTS award-winning Living With Cancer and Great Britons: Churchill. She was appointed head of documentaries for Muriel Gray's Ideal World company in February 2004, and then head of contemporary factual at IWC Media, as it became after its merger with Wark Clements, in 2005.

Moore became a commissioning executive  for documentaries at the BBC in 2006, responsible for the Emmy award-winning Stephen Fry's Secret Life of the Manic Depressive and Bafta award-winning Evicted. After a period as temporary charge, she formally became the commissioning editor of Documentaries in May 2009, responsible for 220 hours of programming per annum across the BBC's four television channels with an annual budget of £30 million by 2011. 

In this role she gave the go-ahead for BBC2's Welcome to Lagos, Protecting Our Children, a programme on assisted suicide, Terry Pratchett: Choosing to Die, 7/7 One Day in London, Inside Claridges and The Great British Bake Off among others. Rivals at Channel 4 suggested Moore's preference for authored documentaries might give her output an "old fashioned" air, a criticism she rejected in June 2011. She rejected that channel's fondness for 'fixed rig' programmes, like One Born Every Minute and Coppers which, Moore has said, appear to repeat the same narrative in each episode: "Where are the layers and complexity? It is difficult for them to be inventive and risky."

Controller of BBC One
In February 2013 Moore was appointed acting controller of Daytime Television for the BBC, and had been acting controller of BBC One since Danny Cohen's promotion to Director of BBC Television on 7 May. She became controller of BBC One in June 2013.

At the time Moore became BBC One controller, the media commentator Maggie Brown wrote that "her appointment signals a rising appreciation of collaborative team players with an eye on the greater good of the BBC".

BBC Director of Content 
In January 2016, it was announced that the controller posts for the BBC channels were to be abolished and that Moore would assume the overall post for all of them, including responsibility for the iPlayer, later in the year. She became the BBC's first Director of Content.

In May 2020 she was shortlisted to become the next Director-General of the BBC after Tony Hall's departure.

BBC Chief Content Officer and appointment to BBC Board 
On 3 September 2020, it was announced that Moore had been made BBC Chief Content Officer as of that date, joining the BBC Board in the process and becoming the senior creative lead for the corporation's content and audiences apart from the news, nations and regions. The role sees her assume responsibility for commissioning across all the BBC network TV channels and iPlayer, as well as commissioning and production for the BBC's 10 national radio networks plus BBC Sounds. In addition, her responsibilities include multi-platform commissioning and production for the entire children's and education content of the BBC, plus the BBC Proms, Orchestras and Choirs.

Personal life
Moore is married to cinematographer Johann Perry, with whom she has two children.

References

External links
 

1968 births
Living people
Alumni of the University of Bristol
BBC executives
British television producers
British women television producers
Fellows of the Royal Television Society
BBC One controllers
People educated at Wycombe Abbey
BBC Board members